A split-level home (also called a bi-level home or tri-level home) is a style of house in which the floor levels are staggered. There are typically two short sets of stairs, one running upward to a bedroom level, and one going downward toward a basement area.

History
The style gained popularity in North America during the mid-20th century, as the suburbs expanded, beginning in the years after World War II, and has remained a popular housing style from the 1950s onward.

Styles

Split level
The split level has two or three short sets of stairs, and three (tri-level) or four (quad) levels. The entry is on a middle floor between two floors. The front door opens directly into what is usually the formal living area, which is typically partially above ground level. Below that may be a small crawl space. The lower level is a finished area partially underground (approximately three feet below grade) and must have an outside entry door.  Above the lower level are bedrooms. Sometimes a short flight above the bedroom floor is another single bedroom. Above that is typically an attic accessed by either another flight of stairs or an opening placed high in a closet. A typical tri-level appears to be a lowered colonial on one side of the house and a ranch on the other side with a crawl space below the ranch. A typical quad-level appears to be a lowered colonial on one side of the house and a ranch on the other side with a basement below the ranch.

Regional variance in usage
In some regions, such as the Northeastern United States, the term "split level" can be used to refer to a bi-level house with a split entry. This style of house is also known as a "split foyer". This is a two-story house that has a small entrance foyer with stairs that "split"—part of a flight of stairs go up (usually to the living room, kitchen, and bedrooms) and part of  a flight of stairs go down (usually to a family room and garage/storage area).

See also

List of building types
Splanch
Maisonette
Ranch-style house

References

External links
 A comprehensive guide to split level architecture and enhancement.

American architectural styles
House styles